Uganda competed at one edition of the Deaflympics: the 1997 Summer Deaflympics held in Copenhagen, Denmark. The country sent a delegation of twelve athletes (eleven men and one woman) and did not win any medals.

The country has not yet competed at the Winter Deaflympics.

Medal tallies

Summer Deaflympics

References 

Nations at the Deaflympics
Deaf culture in Uganda
D